The women's 50 metres event at the 1967 European Indoor Games was held on 11 and 12 March in Prague.

Medalists

Results

Heats
First 3 from each heat (Q) qualified directly for the final.

Final

References

60 metres at the European Athletics Indoor Championships
50